The 1979 Colgate International was a women's tennis tournament played on outdoor grass courts at Devonshire Park in Eastbourne in the United Kingdom. The event was part of the AAA category of the 1979 Colgate Series. It was the fifth edition of the tournament and was held from 18 June through 23 June 1979. Second-seeded Chris Evert survived four match points in the three-hour final against first-seeded Martina Navratilova to win the singles title and earn $20,000 first-prize money.

Finals

Singles
 Chris Evert defeated  Martina Navratilova 7–5, 5–7, 13–11
It was Evert's 6th singles title of the year and the 91st of her career.

Doubles
 Betty Stöve /  Wendy Turnbull defeated  Ilana Kloss /  Betty-Ann Stuart 6–2, 6–2

Prize money

See also
 Evert–Navratilova rivalry

Notes

References

External links
 Women's Tennis Association (WTA) tournament event details
 International Tennis federation (ITF) tournament event details

Colgate International
Eastbourne International
Colgate International
Colgate International
1979 in English women's sport